The Dawes Act of 1887 (also known as the General Allotment Act or the Dawes Severalty Act of 1887) regulated land rights on tribal territories within the United States. Named after Senator Henry L. Dawes of Massachusetts, it authorized the President of the United States to subdivide Native American tribal communal landholdings into allotments for Native American heads of families and individuals. This would convert traditional systems of land tenure into a government-imposed system of private property by forcing Native Americans to "assume a capitalist and proprietary relationship with property" that did not previously exist in their cultures. The act allowed tribes the option to sell the lands that remained after allotment to the federal government. Before private property could be dispensed, the government had to determine "which Indians were eligible" for allotments, which propelled an "official search for a federal definition of Indian-ness."

Although the act was passed in 1887, the federal government implemented the Dawes Act "on a tribe-by-tribe basis" thereafter. For example, in 1895, Congress passed the Hunter Act, which administered Dawes "among the Southern Ute." The nominal purpose of the act was to protect "the property of the natives" as well as to compel "their absorption into the American mainstream."

Native peoples who were deemed to be "mixed-blood" were forced to accept U.S. citizenship, while others were "detribalized." Between 1887 and 1934, Native Americans "lost control of about 100 million acres of land" (United States has 1.9 billion acres of land ) or about "two-thirds of the land base they held in 1887" as a result of the act. The loss of land and the break-up of traditional leadership of tribes produced negative cultural and social effects that have since prompted scholars to refer to the act as one of the most destructive U.S. policies for Native Americans in history.

The "Five Civilized Tribes" (Cherokee, Chickasaw, Choctaw, Muscogee, and Seminole) in Indian Territory were initially exempt from the Dawes Act. The Dawes Commission was established in 1893 as a delegation to register members of tribes for allotment of lands. They came to define tribal belonging in terms of blood-quantum. But, because there was no method of determining precise bloodlines, commission members often assigned "full-blood status" to Native Americans who were perceived as "poorly-assimilated" or "legally incompetent," and "mixed-blood status" to Native Americans who "most resembled whites," regardless of how they identified culturally.

The Curtis Act of 1898 extended the provisions of the Dawes Act to the "Five Civilized Tribes," required the abolition of their governments and dissolution of tribal courts, allotment of communal lands to individuals registered as tribal members, and sale of lands declared surplus. This law was "an outgrowth of the land rush of 1889, and completed the extinction of Indian land claims in the territory. This violated the promise of the United States that the Indian territory would remain Indian land in perpetuity," completed the obliteration of tribal land titles in Indian Territory, and prepared for admission of the territory land to the Union as the state of Oklahoma.

The Dawes Act was amended again in 1906 under the Burke Act.

During the Great Depression, the Franklin D. Roosevelt administration passed the US Indian Reorganization Act (also known as the Wheeler-Howard Law) on June 18, 1934. It prohibited any further land allotment and created a "New Deal" for Native Americans, which renewed their rights to reorganize and form self-governments in order to "rebuild an adequate land base."

The "Indian Problem"
During the early 1800s, the United States federal government attempted to address what it referred to as the "Indian Problem." Numerous new European immigrants were settling on the eastern border of the Indian territories, where most of the Native American tribes had been relocated. Conflicts between the groups increased as they competed for resources and operated according to different cultural systems. Many European Americans did not believe that members of the two societies could coexist within the same communities. Searching for a quick solution to their problem, Commissioner of Indian Affairs William Medill proposed establishing "colonies" or "reservations" that would be exclusively for the natives, similar to those which some native tribes had created for themselves in the east. It was a form of removal whereby the US government would uproot the natives from current locations to areas in the region beyond the Mississippi River. This would enable settlement by European Americans in the Southeast, where there was a growing demand for access to new lands by them. With the removal of the Indians, whites would be protected from the corrupt "evil" ways of the subordinate natives.

The new policy intended to concentrate Native Americans in areas away from encroaching settlers, but it resulted in considerable suffering and many deaths. During the later nineteenth century, Native American tribes resisted the imposition of the reservation system and engaged with the United States Army in what were called the Indian Wars in the West for decades. Finally defeated by the US military force and continuing waves of encroaching settlers, the tribes negotiated agreements to resettle on reservations.

The Reservation system, though forced upon Native Americans, allotted each tribe a claim to their new lands, protection over their territories, and the right to govern themselves. With the US Senate to be involved only for negotiation and ratification of treaties, the Native Americans adjusted their ways of life and tried to continue their traditions. The traditional tribal organization, a defining characteristic of Native Americans as a social unit, became apparent to the non-native communities of the United States and created a mixed stir of emotions. The tribe was viewed as a highly cohesive group, led by a hereditary, chosen chief, who exercised power and influence among the members of the tribe by aging traditions. Administering the reservation system revealed corruption and abuse at many levels, and often Native Americans were left wanting for supplies, annuities and cash.

By the end of the 1880s, many US stakeholders seemed to have reached consensus that the assimilation of Native Americans into American culture was top priority and needed for the peoples' very survival. This was the belief among people who admired them, as well as people who thought they needed to leave behind their tribal landholding, reservations, traditions and ultimately their Indian identities. Senator Henry Dawes launched a campaign to "rid the nation of tribalism through the virtues of private property, allotting land parcels to Indian heads of family."

On February 8, 1887, the Dawes Allotment Act was signed into law by President Grover Cleveland. Responsible for enacting the allotment of the tribal reservations into plots of land for individual households, the Dawes Act was intended by reformers to achieve six goals:
 breaking up of tribes as a social unit,
 encouraging individual initiatives,
 furthering the progress of native farmers,
 reducing the cost of native administration,
 securing parts of the reservations as Indian land, and
 opening the remainder of the land to white settlers for profit.

The Act facilitated assimilation; they would become more "Euro-Americanized" as the government allotted the reservations and the Indians adapted to subsistence farming, the primary model at the time. Native Americans held specific ideologies pertaining to tribal land, to them the land and earth were things to be valued and cared for, it represented the plants and animals that produced and sustained life, it embodied their existence and identity, and was part of their environment of belonging. In contrast to most of their white counterparts, they did not see the land from an economic standpoint.

But, many natives began to believe they had to adapt to the majority culture in order to survive. They would have to embrace these beliefs and surrender to the forces of progress. They were to adopt the values of the dominant society and see land as real estate to be bought and developed; they learned how to use their land effectively in order to become prosperous farmers. As they were inducted as citizens of the country, they would shed those of their discourses and ideologies that were presumed to be uncivilized, and exchange them for ones that allowed them to become industrious self-supporting citizens, and finally rid themselves of their "need" for government supervision.

Provisions of the Dawes Act
The important provisions of the Dawes Act were:
 the allotments would be held in trust by the U.S. Government for 25 years;
 Eligible Native Americans had four years to select their land; afterward the selection would be made for them by the Secretary of the Interior.

Every member of the bands or tribes receiving a land allotment is subject to laws of the state or territory in which they reside. Every Native American who receives a land allotment "and has adopted the habits of civilized life" (lived separate and apart from the tribe) is bestowed with United States citizenship "without in any manner impairing or otherwise affecting the right of any such Indian to tribal or other property".

The Secretary of the Interior could issue rules to assure equal distribution of water for irrigation among the tribes, and provided that "no other appropriation or grant of water by any riparian proprietor shall be authorized or permitted to the damage of any other riparian proprietor."

The Dawes Act did not apply to the territory of the:
 Cherokee, Creek, Choctaw, Chickasaw, Seminole, Miami, and Peoria in Indian Territory
 Osage and Sac and Fox in the Oklahoma Territory
 any of the reservations of the Seneca Nation of New York, or
 a strip of territory in the State of Nebraska adjoining the Sioux Nation
 Red Lake Ojibwe Reservation
 The Osage Tribe of Oklahoma

Provisions were later extended to the Wea, Peoria, Kaskaskia, Piankeshaw, and Western Miami tribes by act of 1889. Allotment of the lands of these tribes was mandated by the Act of 1891, which amplified the provisions of the Dawes Act.

Dawes Act 1891 Amendments
In 1891 the Dawes Act was amended:
 Allowed for pro-rata distribution when the reservation did not have enough land for each individual to receive allotments in original quantities, and provided that when land is only suitable for grazing purposes, such land be allotted in double quantities
 Established criteria for inheritance
 Does not apply to Cherokee Outlet

Provisions of the Curtis Act
The Curtis Act of 1898 extended the provisions of the Dawes Act to the Five Civilized Tribes in Indian Territory. It did away with their self-government, including tribal courts. In addition to providing for allotment of lands to tribal members, it authorized the Dawes Commission to make determination of members when registering tribal members.

Provisions of the Burke Act
The Burke Act of 1906 amended the sections of the Dawes Act dealing with US Citizenship (Section 6) and the mechanism for issuing allotments. The Secretary of Interior could force the Native American Allottee to accept title for land. US Citizenship was granted unconditionally upon receipt of land allotment (the individual did not need to move off the reservation to receive citizenship). Land allotted to Native Americans was taken out of Trust and subject to taxation. The Burke Act did not apply to any Native Americans in Indian Territory.

Effects

Identity and detribalization 
The effects of the Dawes Act were destructive on Native American sovereignty, culture, and identity since it empowered the U.S. government to:

 legally preempt the sovereign right of Indians to define themselves
 implement the specious notion of blood-quantum as the legal criteria for defining Indians
 institutionalize divisions between "full-bloods" and "mixed-bloods"
 "detribalize" a sizeable segment of the Indian population
 legally appropriate vast tracts of Indian land

The federal government initially viewed the Dawes Act as such a successful "democratic experiment" that they decided to further exploit the use of blood-quantum laws and the notion of "federal recognition" as the qualifying means for "dispensing other resources and services such as health care and educational funding" to Native Americans long after its passage. Under Dawes, "land parcels were dispersed" in accordance with perceived blood quanta. Indigenous people labeled "full-blooded" were allocated "relatively small parcels of land deeded with trust patents over which the government retained complete control for a minimum of twenty-five years." Those who were labeled "mixed-blood" were "deeded larger and better tracts of land, with 'patents in fee simple' (complete control), but were also forced to accept U.S. citizenship and relinquish tribal status."

Additionally, Native Americans who did not "meet the established criteria" as being either "full-blood" or "mixed-blood" were effectively "detribalized," being "deposed of their American Indian identity and displaced from their homelands, discarded into the nebula of American otherness." While the Dawes Act is "typically recognized" as the "primary instigation of divisions between tribal and detribalized Indians," the history of detribalization in the United States "actually precedes Dawes."

Land loss 
The Dawes Act ended Native American communal holding of property (with crop land often being privately owned by families or clans), by which they had ensured that everyone had a home and a place in the tribe. The act "was the culmination of American attempts to destroy tribes and their governments and to open Indian lands to settlement by non-Indians and to development by railroads."

Senator Henry M. Teller of Colorado was one of the most outspoken opponents of allotment. In 1881, he said that allotment was a policy "to despoil the Indians of their lands and to make them vagabonds on the face of the earth." Teller also said,

the real aim [of allotment] was to get at the Indian lands and open them up to settlement. The provisions for the apparent benefit of the Indians are but the pretext to get at his lands and occupy them. ... If this were done in the name of Greed, it would be bad enough; but to do it in the name of Humanity ... is infinitely worse.

In 1890, Dawes himself remarked about the incidence of Native Americans losing their land allotments to settlers: "I never knew a white man to get his foot on an Indian's land who ever took it off." The remainder of the land once allotted to appointed natives was declared surplus and sold to non-native settlers as well as railroad and other large corporations; other sections were converted into federal parks and military compounds. The concern shifted from encouraging private native landownership to satisfying the white settlers' demand for larger portions of land.

Given the conditions on the Great Plains, the land granted to most allottees was not sufficient for economic viability of farming. Division of land among heirs upon the allottees' deaths quickly led to land fractionalization. Most allotment land, which could be sold after a statutory period of 25 years, was eventually sold to non-Native buyers at bargain prices. Additionally, land deemed to be "surplus" beyond what was needed for allotment was opened to white settlers, though the profits from the sales of these lands were often invested in programs meant to aid the Native Americans. Over the 47 years of the Act's life, Native Americans lost about 90 million acres (360,000 km2) of treaty land, or about two-thirds of the 1887 land base. About 90,000 Native Americans were made landless.

Culture and gender roles 
The Dawes Act compelled Native Americans to adopt European American culture by illegalizing Indigenous cultural practices and forcibly indoctrinating settler cultural practices and ideologies into Native American families and children. By forcibly transferring communally-owned Native land into private property, the Office of Indian Affairs (OIA) "hoped to transform Native Americans into yeoman farmers and farm wives through the assignment of individual land holdings known as allotments." In an attempt to fulfill this objective, the Dawes Act "outlawed Native American culture and established a code of Indian offenses regulating individual behavior according to Euro-American norms of conduct." Any violations of this code were to be "tried in a Court of Indian Offenses on each reservation." Included with the Dawes Act were "funds to instruct Native Americans in Euro-American patterns of thought and behavior through Indian Service schools."

With the legalized seizure of many Native American land holdings, Indigenous structures of domestic life, gender roles, and tribal identity were critically altered, as was intended by European American society. For instance, "an important objective of the Dawes Act was to restructure Native American gender roles." White settlers who encountered Native American societies in the latter-half of the nineteenth century "judged women's work [in Native societies] as lower in status than that of men" and assumed it was a sign of Indigenous women's "disempowerment and drudgery." As a result, "in evolutionary terms, whites saw women's performance of what seemed to be male tasks – farming, home building, and supply gathering – as a corruption of gender roles and an impediment to progress." In reality, the gendered tasks "accorded many Indigenous women esteem and even rewards and status within their tribes."

By dividing reservation lands into privately owned parcels, legislators hoped to complete the assimilation process by forcing Native Americans to adopt individual households, and strengthen the nuclear family and values of economic dependency strictly within this small household unit. The Dawes Act was thus implemented to destroy "native cultural patterns" by drawing "on theories, common to both ethnologists and material feminists, that saw environmental change as a way to effect social change." Although private property ownership was the "cornerstone" of the act, reformers "believed that civilization could only be effected by concomitant changes to social life" in Indigenous communities. As a result, "they promoted Christian marriages among Indigenous people, forced families to regroup under male heads (a tactic often enforced by renaming), and trained men in wage-earning occupations while encouraging women to support them at home through domestic activities."

Reduction of sovereignty 
In 1906 the Burke Act (also known as the forced patenting act) amended the GAA to give the Secretary of the Interior the power to issue allottees a patent in fee simple to people classified "competent and capable." The criteria for this determination is unclear but meant that allottees deemed "competent" by the Secretary of the Interior would have their land taken out of trust status, subject to taxation, and could be sold by the allottee. The allotted lands of Native Americans determined to be incompetent by the Secretary of the Interior were automatically leased out by the federal government.
The act reads:
... the Secretary of the Interior may, in his discretion, and he is hereby authorized, whenever he shall be satisfied that any Native American allottee is competent and capable of managing his or her affairs at any time to cause to be issued to such allottee a patent in fee simple, and thereafter all restrictions as to sale, encumbrance, or taxation of said land shall be removed.

The use of competence opens up the categorization, making it much more subjective and thus increasing the exclusionary power of the Secretary of Interior. Although this act gives power to the allottee to decide whether to keep or sell the land, given the harsh economic reality of the time, and lack of access to credit and markets, liquidation of Indian lands was almost inevitable. It was known by the Department of Interior that virtually 95% of fee patented land would eventually be sold to whites.

In 1926, Secretary of the Interior Hubert Work commissioned a study of federal administration of Indian policy and the condition of Native American people. Completed in 1928, The Problem of Indian Administrationcommonly known as the Meriam Report after the study's director, Lewis Meriam documented fraud and misappropriation by government agents. In particular, the Meriam Report found that the General Allotment Act had been used to illegally deprive Native Americans of their land rights.

After considerable debate, Congress terminated the allotment process under the Dawes Act by enacting the Indian Reorganization Act of 1934 ("Wheeler-Howard Act"). However, the allotment process in Alaska, under the separate Alaska Native Allotment Act, continued until its revocation in 1971 by the Alaska Native Claims Settlement Act.

Despite termination of the allotment process in 1934, effects of the General Allotment Act continue into the present. For example, one provision of the Act was the establishment of a trust fund, administered by the Bureau of Indian Affairs, to collect and distribute revenues from oil, mineral, timber, and grazing leases on Native American lands. The BIA's alleged improper management of the trust fund resulted in litigation, in particular the case Cobell v. Kempthorne (settled in 2009 for $3.4 billion), to force a proper accounting of revenues.

Fractionation

For nearly one hundred years, the consequences of federal Indian allotments have developed into the problem of fractionation. As original allottees die, their heirs receive equal, undivided interests in the allottees' lands. In successive generations, smaller undivided interests descend to the next generation. Fractionated interests in individual Native American allotted land continue to expand exponentially with each new generation.

These four million interests could expand to 11 million interests by the year 2030 unless an aggressive approach to fractionation is taken. There are now single pieces of property with ownership interests that are less than 0.0000001% or 1/9 millionth of the whole interest, which has an estimated value of 0.004 cent.

The economic consequences of fractionation are severe. Some recent appraisal studies suggest that when the number of owners of a tract of land reaches between ten and twenty, the value of that tract drops to zero. Highly fractionated land is for all practical purposes worthless.

In addition, the fractionation of land and the resultant ballooning number of trust accounts quickly produced an administrative nightmare. Approximately 357 million dollars is collected annually from all sources of trust asset management, including coal sales, timber harvesting, oil and gas leases and other rights-of-way and lease activity. No single fiduciary institution has ever managed as many trust accounts as the Department of the Interior has managed over the last century.

Leasing, use permits, sale revenues, and interest of approximately $226 million per year are collected for approximately 230,000 individual Indian money (IIM) accounts, and about $530 million per year are collected for approximately 1,400 tribal accounts. In addition, the trust currently manages approximately $2.8 billion in tribal funds and $400 million in individual Native American funds.

Under current regulations, probates need to be conducted for every account with trust assets, even those with balances between one cent and one dollar. While the average cost for a probate process exceeds $3,000, even a streamlined, expedited process costing as little as $500 would require almost $10,000,000 to probate the $5,700 in these accounts.

Unlike most private trusts, the federal government bears the entire cost of administering the Indian trust. As a result, the usual incentives found in the commercial sector for reducing the number of small or inactive accounts do not apply to the Indian trust. Similarly, the United States has not adopted many of the tools that states and local government entities have for ensuring that unclaimed or abandoned property is returned to productive use within the local community.

Fractionation is not a new issue. In the 1920s, the Brookings Institution conducted a major study of conditions of the Native American and included data on the impacts of fractionation. This report, which became known as the Meriam Report, was issued in 1928. Its conclusions and recommendations formed the basis for land reform provisions that were included in what would become the IRA. The original versions of the IRA included two key titles, one dealing with probate and the other with land consolidation. Because of opposition to many of these provisions in Indian Country, often by the major European-American ranchers and industry who leased land and other private interests, most were removed while Congress was considering the bill. The final version of the IRA included only a few basic land reform and probate measures. Although Congress enabled major reforms in the structure of tribes through the IRA and stopped the allotment process, it did not meaningfully address fractionation as had been envisioned by John Collier, then Commissioner of Indian Affairs, or the Brookings Institution.

In 1922, the General Accounting Office (GAO) conducted an audit of 12 reservations to determine the severity of fractionation on those reservations. The GAO found that on the 12 reservations for which it compiled data, there were approximately 80,000 discrete owners but, because of fractionation, there were over a million ownership records associated with those owners. The GAO also found that if the land were physically divided by the fractional interests, many of these interests would represent less than one square foot of ground. In early 2002, the Department of the Interior attempted to replicate the audit methodology used by the GAO and to update the GAO report data to assess the continued growth of fractionation; it found that it increased by more than 40% between 1992 and 2002.

As an example of continuing fractionation, consider a real tract identified in 1987 in Hodel v. Irving, 481 U.S. 704 (1987):

Fractionation has become significantly worse. As noted above, in some cases the land is so highly fractionated that it can never be made productive. With such small ownership interests, it is nearly impossible to obtain the level of consent necessary to lease the land. In addition, to manage highly fractionated parcels of land, the government spends more money probating estates, maintaining title records, leasing the land, and attempting to manage and distribute tiny amounts of income to individual owners than is received in income from the land. In many cases, the costs associated with managing these lands can be significantly more than the value of the underlying asset.

Criticisms
Angie Debo's, And Still the Waters Run: The Betrayal of the Five Civilized Tribes (1940), claimed the allotment policy of the Dawes Act (as later extended to apply to the Five Civilized Tribes through the Dawes Commission and the Curtis Act of 1898) was systematically manipulated to deprive the Native Americans of their lands and resources. Ellen Fitzpatrick claimed, Debo's book "advanced a crushing analysis of the corruption, moral depravity, and criminal activity that underlay white administration and execution of the allotment policy."

See also
 Act for the Protection of the People of Indian Territory (Curtis Act), 1898
 Forced Fee Patenting Act (Burke Act), 1906
 Indian Reorganization Act
 Nelson Act of 1889, Minnesota's version of the Dawes Act
 Americanization of Native Americans
 Aboriginal title in the United States
 Competency Commission
 Land run
 Diminishment
 Great Māhele
 Land Buy-Back Program for Tribal Nations
 Checkerboarding (land)
 Indian Removal
 Detraditionalization
 Detribalization
 Tribal disenrollment
 Indian termination policy

Notes

Further reading
 Debo, Angie.  And Still the Waters Run: The Betrayal of the Five Civilized Tribes (Princeton: Princeton University Press, 1940; new edition, Norman: University of Oklahoma Press, 1984), .
 Olund, Eric N. (2002). "Public Domesticity during the Indian Reform Era; or, Mrs. Jackson is induced to go to Washington." Gender, Place, and Culture 9: 153–166.
 Stremlau, Rose. (2005). "To Domesticate and Civilize Wild Indians": Allotment and the Campaign to Reform Indian Families, 1875–1887. Journal of Family History 30: 265–286.

External links

 Dawes Act of 1887: full text from the Native American Documents Project
 Dawes Act (1887) Information & Videos – Chickasaw.TV
 Wheeler-Howard Act (Indian Reorganization Act) 1934
 Oklahoma Digital Maps: Digital Collections of Oklahoma and Indian Territory

Native American history of Oklahoma
United States federal Native American legislation
Aboriginal title in the United States
1887 in American law
49th United States Congress
Repealed United States legislation
United States federal Indian policy
Settlement schemes in the United States